Hamza Touba (born 6 November 1991) is a German boxer. He competed in the men's flyweight event at the 2016 Summer Olympics where he lost in the round of 32 to Elie Konki of France.

References

External links
 

1991 births
Living people
German male boxers
Olympic boxers of Germany
Boxers at the 2016 Summer Olympics
Boxers at the 2015 European Games
Boxers at the 2019 European Games
European Games medalists in boxing
European Games bronze medalists for Germany
Sportspeople from Neuss
Flyweight boxers
21st-century German people